The Evergreen School (formerly known as The Evergreen School for Gifted Children) is an independent school in Shoreline, Washington, a northern suburb of Seattle, Washington, United States.  Evergreen is an elementary-middle school that serves highly capable students from preschool to eighth grade.

The school was founded in 1963 by Edith Christensen, with an initial enrollment of six children. Enrollment as of September 2005 was 392 students, with an average of 16 students per classroom.  The Evergreen School is accredited by the Pacific Northwest Association of Independent Schools (PNAIS) and the Northwest Association of Schools & Universities (NASCU).

Academics
Evergreen offers a set of special programs that include French, Spanish and Mandarin Chinese, as well as photography (digital), computer literacy, music, art and drama classes. German used to be offered, but it was phased out, and the 2013 8th graders were the last students to be taught German at the school. Eighth grade students go on a month-long Global Studies program to a foreign country that is relatively underdeveloped.  The class of 2015 went to Vietnam, the class of 2016 to Peru, the class of 2017 went to Peru, and the class of 2018 went to Vietnam. The class of 2019 went to Peru. The class of 2020 would have gone to Vietnam if not for the COVID-19 pandemic and a severe lack of maidens. This year, the 2023 class will be going to Vietnam.

Sports
Evergreen offers soccer, cross country, volleyball, basketball, tennis, and ultimate frisbee. The Evergreen School physical education program also offers fitness tests which consist of the shuttle run, push-ups, plank hold, sit and reach, jump roping, and the mile run. The record holder for the push-ups, plank hold, and sit and reach is Mateo Baptista-Allan with a 45-minute plank, 110 push-ups, and a 13-inch sit and reach. The record holder for the shuttle run is Xander Holtz with a 32.5-second shuttle run. The record holder for the jump rope test is Jason Conover with 152 jump ropes in 1 minute. The record holder for the mile run is Ben Schwartz with a time of 5:53. Henry Kaplan also has the most amount of one-legged jump ropes in 60 seconds with 52 due to him having a broken leg.

Clubs and programs
Evergreen offers over 50 after-school clubs and enrichment classes. The two major clubs are the chess and math clubs.  Enrichment classes include:
Art
Drama
Fencing
Handicrafts
Music
Science
Technology
World Languages
Cooking food
Programming
Geography
Robotics
Debate

Notable achievements
In 1967, the Evergreen School became the 1st school in North America to have created a certified school habitat, sponsored by World Wildlife Fund.

In 2003, the school's kindergarten-through-third-grade chess team won the National Elementary Chess Championship in Nashville, Tennessee.

In 2005, King County awarded the school the Green Globe Award for being a community environmental leader with its food composting and worm bin programs.

In 2009, the Evergreen School's kindergarten-through-fifth-grade won seventh at the National Elementary Chess Championship in Georgia.

The school is responsible for reviving neighboring wetlands and nearby Meridian Creek, which flows into Thornton Creek.

In 2010 Evergreen was named one of the top 10 Washington schools for 2009 by the Johns Hopkins University Center for Talented Youth Search.

In 2013, Evergreen celebrated its 50th birthday.

In 2015, Evergreen finished remodeling the campus.

References

External links
 
 Evergreen School profile at schooltree.org

Educational institutions established in 1963
Private elementary schools in Washington (state)
Private middle schools in Washington (state)
Schools in King County, Washington
Gifted education
Shoreline, Washington
1963 establishments in Washington (state)